Glückstadt is a town in the Steinburg district of Schleswig-Holstein, Germany. Glückstadt is part of the Hamburg Metropolitan Region (Metropolregion Hamburg).

History

Glückstadt was founded in 1617 on the marsh lands along the Elbe by the Duke of Holstein, King Christian IV of Denmark, who had levees and fortifications built as well as a ducal residence. Its name translates to English literally as "Luck City" or "Fortune City". As Christian IV promised the settlers tax exemption and freedom of religion, Glückstadt soon became an important trading centre, intended to compete with the Imperial city of Hamburg, located upstream on the Elbe. Calvinists, Remonstrants and Mennonites (Anabaptists) from the Netherlands settled here, as well as Sephardic Jews and Catholics.

After the king had interfered in the Thirty Years' War, the town in 1627/28 was besieged for fifteen weeks by the united Imperial and Catholic troops under the command of Albrecht von Wallenstein and Count Tilly, though without success.

In 1649 Christian’s son and successor King Frederik III of Denmark had the seat of the Holstein administration moved to Glückstadt, whereafter the duchy became known as Holstein-Glückstadt. In 1773 the town became the capital of all Holstein lands, when the lands of the Holstein-Gottorp line were finally incorporated. During the War of the Sixth Coalition in 1814 Glückstadt was blockaded by the allies and capitulated, whereupon its fortifications were demolished. In 1830 it was made a free port.

Holstein-Glückstadt remained a possession of the Danish Crown until its defeat in the Second Schleswig War of 1864. It was occupied by Austria, but finally incorporated into the Prussian Province of Schleswig-Holstein in the aftermath of the 1866 Austro-Prussian War.

Transport
In 1845, Glückstadt station opened on the Marsh Railway line from Elmshorn, which in 1857 was continued to Itzehoe. Today trains run from Hamburg-Altona station to Westerland on Sylt island. Glückstadt also has a ferry service across the Elbe to Wischhafen in Lower Saxony. It is a stop on the Deutsche Fährstraße theme road and the Elbe Cycle Route.

Notable people
Chronological list

Kurt Benirschke (1924-2018), pathologist, geneticist, inventor of the Frozen zoo
Christoffer Gabel (1617-1673), Danish statesman and merchant, governor of the Faroe Islands and Copenhagen, most powerful adviser of Frederick III of Denmark
Willi Holdorf (1940-2020), Olympic gold medal winner (decathlon, 1964)
Theodor Olshausen (1802-1869), lawyer, politician, 1848 revolutionary
John C. Petersen (1842-1887), butcher, farmer, and Wisconsin legislator
August Friedrich Schenck (1828-1901), a painter, well known for his landscapes and paintings of animals
Rudolf von Willemoes-Suhm (1847-1875), zoologist, and research traveler

References

Populated places established in 1617
Towns in Schleswig-Holstein
Steinburg
Populated riverside places in Germany
Populated places on the Elbe
1617 establishments in the Holy Roman Empire